Simon Francis Thrush FRSNZ (born 10 November 1958) is a New Zealand marine scientist and current Director of the Institute of Marine Science at the University of Auckland.

He graduated from the University of Otago with a first class BSc in Zoology in 1980, and completed his PhD at the University of East Anglia in 1985. He is a Fellow of the Royal Society of New Zealand, and in 2010 was awarded the New Zealand Marine Sciences Life Time Achievement Award.

Selected publications

References 

1958 births
Living people
New Zealand biologists
University of Otago alumni
Alumni of the University of East Anglia
Academic staff of the University of Auckland
Fellows of the Royal Society of New Zealand